Convolvulaceae, commonly called the bindweeds or morning glories, is a family of about 60 genera and more than 1,650 species. These species are primarily herbaceous vines, but also include trees, shrubs and herbs. The tubers of several species are edible, the best known of which is the sweet potato.

Description 
Convolvulaceae can be recognized by their funnel-shaped, radially symmetrical corolla; the floral formula for the family has five sepals, five fused petals, five epipetalous stamens (stamens fused to the petals), and a two-part syncarpous and superior gynoecium. The stems of these plants are usually winding, hence their Latin name (from convolvere, "to wind"). The leaves are simple and alternate, without stipules. In parasitic Cuscuta (dodder) they are reduced to scales. The fruit can be a capsule, berry, or nut, all containing only two seeds per one locule (one ovule/ovary).

The leaves and starchy, tuberous roots of some species are used as foodstuffs (e.g. sweet potato and water spinach), and the seeds are exploited for their medicinal value as purgatives. Some species contain ergoline alkaloids that are likely responsible for the use of these species as ingredients in psychedelic drugs (e.g. ololiuhqui). The presence of ergolines in some species of this family is due to infection by fungi related to the ergot fungi of the genus Claviceps. A recent study of Convolvulaceae species, Ipomoea asarifolia, and its associated fungi showed the presence of a fungus, identified by DNA sequencing of 18s and ITS ribosomal DNA and phylogenetic analysis to be closely related to fungi in the family Clavicipitaceae, was always associated with the presence of ergoline alkaloids in the plant. The identified fungus appears to be a seed-transmitted, obligate biotroph growing epiphytically on its host. This finding strongly suggests the unique presence of ergoline alkaloids in some species of the family Convolvulaceae is due to symbiosis with clavicipitaceous fungi. Moreover, another group of compounds, loline alkaloids, commonly produced by some members of the clavicipitaceous fungi (genus Neotyphodium), has been identified in a convolvulaceous species, but the origin of the loline alkaloids in this species is unknown.

Members of the family are well known as showy garden plants (e.g. morning glory) and as troublesome weeds (e.g. bindweed (mainly Convolvulus and Calystegia) and dodder), while Humbertia madagascariensis is a medium-sized tree and Ipomoea carnea is an erect shrub. Some parasitic members of this family are also used medicinally.

Genera

Tribe Aniseieae
Aniseia Choisy
Odonellia K.R.Robertson
Tetralocularia O'Donell

Tribe Cardiochlamyeae
Cardiochlamys Oliv.
Cordisepalum Verdc.
Dinetus Buch.-Ham. ex Sweet
Duperreya Gaudich.
Poranopsis Roberty
Tridynamia Gagnep.

Tribe Convolvuleae
Calystegia R.Br. – Bindweed, morning glory
Convolvulus L. – bindweed, morning glory
Jacquemontia Choisy
Polymeria R.Br.

Tribe Cresseae
Bonamia Thouars
Cladostigma Radlk.
Cressa L.
Evolvulus L.
Hildebrandtia Vatke
Seddera Hochst.
Stylisma Raf.
Wilsonia R. Br.

Tribe Cuscuteae
Cuscuta L. – dodder
Tribe Dichondreae
Dichondra J.R.Forst. & G.Forst.
Falkia Thunb.
Nephrophyllum A.Rich.
Petrogenia I.M.Johnst.

Tribe Erycibeae
Erycibe Roxb.

Tribe Humbertieae
Humbertia

Tribe Ipomoeeae
Argyreia Lour. – Hawaiian baby woodrose
Astripomoea A.Meeuse
Blinkworthia Choisy
Ipomoea L. – morning glory, sweet potato
Lepistemon Blume
Lepistemonopsis Dammer
Paralepistemon Lejoly & Lisowski
Rivea Choisy
Stictocardia Hallier f.

Tribe Maripeae
Dicranostyles Benth.
Itzaea Standl. & Steyerm.
Lysiostyles Benth.
Maripa Aubl.

Tribe Poraneae
Calycobolus Willd. ex Schult.
Dipteropeltis Hallier f.
Metaporana N.E.Br.
Neuropeltis Wall.
Neuropeltopsis Ooststr.
Porana Burm.f.
Rapona Baill.

Incertae sedis
Camonea Raf.
Daustinia Buril & Simões
Decalobanthus Ooststr.
Distimake Raf.
Hewittia Wight & Arn.
Hyalocystis Hallier f.
Keraunea Cheek & Sim.-Bianch.
Merremia Dennst. ex Endl. – Hawaiian woodrose
Operculina Silva Manso
Remirema Kerr
Xenostegia D.F.Austin & Staples

References

Further reading

Austin, D. F. 1997. Convolvulaceae (Morning Glory Family)
Convolvulus plant
Convolvulaceae in L. Watson and M. J. Dallwitz (1992 onwards). The families of flowering plants.

Costea, M. 2007-onwards. Digital Atlas of Cuscuta (Convolvulaceae)
Lyons, K. E. 2001. Element stewardship abstract for Convolvulus arvensis L. field bindweed. The Nature Conservancy.
Calif. Dept. of Food and Agriculture. Undated. Field bindweed (Convolvulus arvensis L.)
Univ. of Idaho Extension. 1999. Homewise: No matter what we do, our morning glory weeds come back every year. Any advice? Aug. 23
Hodges, L. 2003. Bindweed identification and control options for organic production. NebFacts. Univ. of Nebraska – Lincoln Cooperative Extension
Univ. of California Agriculture and Natural Resources. 2003. Field Bindweed. Pest Notes. Publ. # 7462
Washington State Univ. Cooperative Extension. Undated. Hortsense: Weeds: Field bindweed (Wild morningglory): Convolvulus arvensis
Sullivan, P. 2004. Field bindweed control alternatives. ATTRA. National Sustainable Agriculture Information Service.
Lanini, W. T. Undated. Organic weed management in vineyards. University of California, Davis Cooperative Extension.
Cox, H. R. 1915. The eradication of bindweed or wild morning-glory. U.S. Dept. of Agriculture Farmers’ Bulletin 368. Washington, D. C.: Government Printing Office.

New Mexico State Univ. Cooperative Extension Service. 2004. Managing Aceria malherbae gall mites for control of field bindweed.

External links

Convolvulaceae Unlimited
Convolvulaceae in Topwalks
Family Convolvulaceae Flowers in Israel

 
Asterid families